Novooleksiivka is an urban-type settlement in the Henichesk raion of Kherson oblast, Ukraine. It belongs to the Henichesk urban hromada, one of the hromadas of Ukraine. It had a population of

History 
In 1874, near the village Novooleksiivka (now Oleksyivka village), a small railway station, also called Novooleksiivka, was founded. At the same time, a station settlement of the same name arose around the station, which then became a major settlement. As the cargo turnover of the station was small, the population of Novooleksiivka was mainly engaged in agriculture. It was a part of the Dniprovsky district of the Tavriya Governorate at that time.

In 1908, the first school was built at Novooleksiivka at the expense of local peasants, where 2 teachers were employed and 64 pupils were engaged. In 1930, a sovkhoz fruit-producing farm was built, whose main activity was the production, harvesting, storage, processing and sale of seeds.

Religion 
There is an orthodox church, the Protection of Our Most Holy Lady Theotokos, a mosque, the Adzhy Belial Dzhami mosque.

See also 

 Russian occupation of Kherson Oblast

References

External links 
 

Cities in Kherson Oblast
Populated places established in the Russian Empire
Henichesk Raion